Legality of the Threat or Use of Nuclear Weapons [1996] ICJ 3 is a landmark international law case, where the International Court of Justice gave an advisory opinion stating that while the threat or use of nuclear weapons would generally be contrary to international humanitarian law, it cannot be concluded whether or not such a threat or use of nuclear weapons would be lawful in extreme circumstances where the very survival of a state would be at stake. The Court held that there is no source of international law that explicitly authorises or prohibits the threat or use of nuclear weapons but such threat or use must be in conformity with the UN Charter and principles of international humanitarian law. The Court also concluded that there was a general obligation to pursue nuclear disarmament. 

The World Health Organization requested the opinion on 3 September 1993, but it was initially refused because the WHO was acting outside its legal capacity (ultra vires). So the United Nations General Assembly requested another opinion in December 1994, accepted by the Court in January 1995. As well as determining the illegality of nuclear weapon use, the court discussed the proper role of international judicial bodies, the ICJ's advisory function, international humanitarian law (jus in bello), and rules governing the use of force (jus ad bellum). It explored the status of "Lotus approach", and employed the concept of non liquet. There were also strategic questions such as the legality of the practice of nuclear deterrence or the meaning of Article VI of the 1968 Treaty on the Non-Proliferation of Nuclear Weapons.

The possibility of threat outlawing use of nuclear weapons in an armed conflict was raised on 30 June 1950, by the Dutch representative to the International Law Commission (ILC) J.P.A. François, who suggested this "would in itself be an advance". In addition, the Polish government requested this issue to be examined by the ILC as a crime against the peace of mankind. However, the issue was delayed during the Cold War.

Request of the World Health Organization

An advisory opinion on this issue was originally requested by the World Health Organization (WHO) on 3 September 1993:

The ICJ considered the WHO's request, in a case known as the Legality of the Use by a State of Nuclear Weapons in Armed Conflict (General List No. 93), and also known as the WHO Nuclear Weapons case, between 1993 and 1996. The ICJ fixed 10 June 1994 as the time limit for written submissions, but after receiving many written and oral submissions, later extended this date to 20 September 1994. After considering the case the Court refused to give an advisory opinion on the WHO question. On 8 July 1996 it held, by 11 votes to three, that the question did not fall within the scope of WHO's activities, as is required by Article 96(2) of the UN Charter.

Request of the UN General Assembly

On 15 December 1994 the UN General Assembly adopted resolution A/RES/49/75K. This asked the ICJ urgently to render its advisory opinion on the following question:

The resolution, submitted to the Court on 19 December 1994, was adopted by 78 states voting in favour, 43 against, 38 abstaining and 26 not voting.

The General Assembly had considered asking a similar question in the autumn of 1993, at the instigation of the Non-Aligned Movement (NAM), which ultimately did not that year push its request. NAM was more willing the following year, in the face of written statements submitted in the WHO proceedings from a number of nuclear-weapon states indicating strong views to the effect that the WHO lacked competence in the matter. The Court subsequently fixed 20 June 1995 as the filing date for written statements.

Altogether 42 states participated in the written phase of the pleadings, the largest number ever to join in proceedings before the Court. Of the five declared nuclear weapon states only the People's Republic of China did not participate. Of the three "threshold" nuclear-weapon states only India participated. Many of the participants were developing states which had not previously contributed to proceedings before the ICJ, a reflection perhaps of the unparalleled interest in this matter and the growing willingness of developing states to engage in international judicial proceedings in the "post-colonial" period.

Oral hearings were held from 30 October to 15 November 1995. Twenty-two states participated: Australia, Egypt, France, Germany, Indonesia, Mexico, Iran, Italy, Japan, Malaysia, New Zealand, Philippines, Qatar, Russian Federation, San Marino, Samoa, Marshall Islands, Solomon Islands, Costa Rica, United Kingdom, United States, Zimbabwe; as did the WHO. The secretariat of the UN did not appear, but filed with the Court a dossier explaining the history of resolution 49/75K. Each state was allocated 90 minutes to make its statement. On 8 July 1996, nearly eight months after the close of the oral phase, the ICJ rendered its opinion.

Decision of the International Court of Justice

Composition of the Court

The ICJ is composed of fifteen judges elected to nine year terms by the UN General Assembly and the UN Security Council. The court's "advisory opinion" can be requested only by specific United Nations organisations, and is inherently non-binding under the Statute of the court.

The fifteen judges asked to give their advisory opinion regarding the legality of the threat or use of nuclear weapons were:

Court's analysis

Deterrence and "threat"
The court considered the matter of deterrence, which involves a threat to use nuclear weapons under certain circumstances on a potential enemy or an enemy. Was such a threat illegal? The court decided, with some judges dissenting, that, if a threatened retaliatory strike was consistent with military necessity and proportionality, it would not necessarily be illegal. (Judgement paragraphs 37–50)

The legality of the possession of nuclear weapons
The court then considered the legality of the possession, as opposed to actual use, of nuclear weapons. The Court looked at various treaties, including the UN Charter, and found no treaty language that specifically forbade the possession of nuclear weapons in a categorical way.

The UN Charter was examined in paragraphs 37–50 (paragraph 37: "The Court will now address the question of the legality or illegality of recourse to nuclear weapons in the light of the provisions of the Charter relating to the threat or use of force"). Paragraph 39 mentions: "These provisions [i.e. those of the Charter] do not refer to specific weapons. They apply to any use of force, regardless of the weapons employed. The Charter neither expressly prohibits, nor permits, the use of any specific weapon, including nuclear weapons. A weapon that is already unlawful per se, whether by treaty or custom, does not become lawful by reason of its being used for a legitimate purpose under the Charter."

Treaties were examined in paragraphs 53–63 (paragraph 53: "The Court must therefore now examine whether there is any prohibition of recourse to nuclear weapons as such; it will first ascertain whether there is a conventional prescription to this effect"), as part of the law applicable in situations of armed conflict (paragraph 51, first sentence: "Having dealt with the Charter provisions relating to the threat or use of force, the Court will now turn to the law applicable in situations of armed conflict"). In particular, with respect to "the argument [that] has been advanced that nuclear weapons should be treated in the same way as poisoned weapons", the Court concluded that "it does not seem to the Court that the use of nuclear weapons can be regarded as specifically prohibited on the basis of the [...] provisions of the Second Hague Declaration of 1899, the Regulations annexed to the Hague Convention IV of 1907 or the 1925 Protocol" (paragraphs 54 and 56)". It was also argued by some that the Hague Conventions concerning the use of bacteriological or chemical weapons would also apply to nuclear weapons, but the Court was unable to adopt this argument ("The Court does not find any specific prohibition of recourse to nuclear weapons in treaties expressly prohibiting the use of certain weapons of mass destruction", paragraph 57 in fine).

With respect to treaties that "deal [...] exclusively with acquisition, manufacture, possession, deployment and testing of nuclear weapons, without specifically addressing their threat or use," the Court notes that those treaties "certainly point to an increasing concern in the international community with these weapons; the Court concludes from this that these treaties could therefore be seen as foreshadowing a future general prohibition of the use of such weapons, but they do not constitute such a prohibition by themselves" (paragraph 62). Also, regarding regional treaties prohibiting resource, namely those of Tlatelolco (Latin America) and Rarotonga (South Pacific) the Court notes that while those "testify to a growing awareness of the need to liberate the community of States and the international public from the dangers resulting from the existence of nuclear weapons", "[i]t [i.e. the Court] does not, however, view these elements as amounting to a comprehensive and universal conventional prohibition on the use, or the threat of use, of those weapons as such." (paragraph 63).

Customary international law also provided insufficient evidence that the possession of nuclear weapons had come to be universally regarded as illegal.

Ultimately, the court was unable to find an opinio juris (that is, legal consensus) that nuclear weapons are illegal to possess. (paragraph 65) However, in practice, nuclear weapons have not been used in war since 1945 and there have been numerous UN resolutions condemning their use (however, such resolutions are not universally supported—most notably, the nuclear powers object to them).(paragraph 68–73) The ICJ did not find that these facts demonstrated a new and clear customary law absolutely forbidding nuclear weapons.

However, there are many universal humanitarian laws applying to war. For instance, it is illegal for a combatant specifically to target civilians and certain types of weapons that cause indiscriminate damage are categorically outlawed.  All states seem to observe these rules, making them a part of customary international law, so the court ruled that these laws would also apply to the use of nuclear weapons.(paragraph 86) The Court decided not to pronounce on the matter of whether the use of nuclear weapons might possibly be legal, if exercised as a last resort in extreme circumstances (such as if the very existence of the state was in jeopardy).(paragraph 97)

Decision 
The court undertook seven separate votes, all of which were passed:

The court decided to comply with the request for an advisory opinion;
The court replied that "There is in neither customary nor conventional international law any specific authorization of the threat or use of nuclear weapons";
The court replied that "There is in neither customary nor conventional international law any comprehensive and universal prohibition of the threat or use of nuclear weapons as such";
The court replied that "A threat or use of force by means of nuclear weapons that is contrary to Article 2, paragraph 4, of the United Nations Charter and that fails to meet all the requirements of Article 51, is unlawful";
The court replied that "A threat or use of nuclear weapons should also be compatible with the requirements of the international law applicable in armed conflict, particularly those of the principles and rules of humanitarian law, as well as with specific obligations under treaties and other undertakings which expressly deal with nuclear weapons"
The court replied that "the threat or use of nuclear weapons would generally be contrary to the rules of international law applicable in armed conflict, and in particular the principles and rules of humanitarian law; However, in view of the current state of international law, and of the elements of fact at its disposal, the Court cannot conclude definitively whether the threat or use of nuclear weapons would be lawful or unlawful in an extreme circumstance of self-defence, in which the very survival of a State would be at stake"
The court replied that "There exists an obligation to pursue in good faith and bring to a conclusion negotiations leading to nuclear disarmament in all its aspects under strict and effective international control".

The court voted as follows:

Split decision
The only significantly split decision was on the matter of whether "the threat or use of nuclear weapons would generally be contrary to the rules of international law applicable in armed conflict", not including "in an extreme circumstance of self-defence, in which the very survival of a State would be at stake". However, three of the seven "dissenting" judges (namely, Judge Shahabuddeen of Guyana, Judge Weeramantry of Sri Lanka, and Judge Koroma of Sierra Leone) wrote separate opinions explaining that the reason they were dissenting was their view that there is no exception under any circumstances (including that of ensuring the survival of a State) to the general principle that use of nuclear weapons is illegal. A fourth dissenter, Judge Oda of Japan, dissented largely on the ground that the Court simply should not have taken the case.

Vice President Schwebel remarked in his dissenting opinion that

And Higgins noted that she did not

Nevertheless, the Court's opinion did not conclude definitively and categorically, under the existing state of international law at the time, whether in an extreme circumstance of self-defence in which the very survival of a State would be a stake, the threat or use of nuclear weapons would necessarily be unlawful in all possible cases. However, the court's opinion unanimously clarified that the world's states have a binding duty to negotiate in good faith, and to accomplish, nuclear disarmament.

International reaction

United Kingdom

The Government of the United Kingdom has announced plans to renew Britain's only nuclear weapon, the Trident missile system. They have published a white paper The Future of the United Kingdom's Nuclear Deterrent in which they state that the renewal is fully compatible with the United Kingdom's treaty commitments and international law. These arguments are summarised in a question and answer briefing published by UK Permanent Representative to the Conference on Disarmament

The white paper The Future of the United Kingdom's Nuclear Deterrent stands in contrast to two legal opinions. The first, commissioned by Peacerights, was given on 19 December 2005 by Rabinder Singh QC and Professor Christine Chinkin of Matrix Chambers. It addressed

Drawing on the International Court of Justice (ICJ) opinion, Singh and Chinkin argued that:

The second legal opinion was commissioned by Greenpeace and given by Philippe Sands QC and Helen Law, also of Matrix Chambers, on 13 November 2006. The opinion addressed

With regards to the jus ad bellum, Sands and Law found that

The phrase "very survival of the state" is a direct quote from paragraph 97 of the ICJ ruling. With regards to international humanitarian law, they found that

Finally, with reference to the NPT, Sands and Law found that

Scots law

In 1999 a legal case was put forward to attempt to use the ICJ's Opinion in establishing the illegality of nuclear weapons.

On 27 September 1999, three Trident Ploughshares activists Ulla Røder from Denmark, Angie Zelter from England, and Ellen Moxley from Scotland, were acquitted of charges of malicious damage at Greenock Sheriff Court. The three women had boarded Maytime, a barge moored in Loch Goil and involved in scientific work connected with the s berthed in the nearby Gareloch, and caused £80,000 worth of damage. As is often the case in trials relating to such actions, the defendants attempted to establish that their actions were necessary, in that they had prevented what they saw as "nuclear crime".

The acquittal of the Trident Three resulted in the High Court of Justiciary, the supreme criminal court in Scots law, considering a Lord Advocate's Reference, and presenting the first detailed analysis of the ICJ Opinion by another judicial body. The High Court was asked to answer four questions:

In a trial under Scottish criminal procedure, is it competent to lead evidence as to the content of customary international law as it applies in the United Kingdom?
Does any rule of customary international law justify a private individual in Scotland in damaging or destroying property in pursuit of his or her objection to the United Kingdom's possession of nuclear weapons, its action in placing such weapons at locations within Scotland or its policies in relation to such weapons?
Does the belief of an accused person that his or her actions are justified in law constitute a defence to a charge of malicious mischief or theft?
Is it a general defence to a criminal charge that the offence was committed in order to prevent or bring to an end the commission of an offence by another person?

The four collective answers given by Lord Prosser, Lord Kirkwood and Lord Penrose were all negative. This did not have the effect of overturning the acquittals of Roder, Zelter and Moxley (Scots law, like many other jurisdictions, does not allow for an acquittal to be appealed); however, it does have the effect of invalidating the ratio decidendi under which the three women were able to argue for their acquittal, and ensures that similar defences cannot be present in Scots Law.

See also
Global Security Institute
International humanitarian law
List of International Court of Justice cases
Martens Clause
Mutual assured destruction
Nuclear warfare
Nuclear weapons convention
Humanitarian Initiative
Parliamentarians for Nuclear Non-Proliferation and Disarmament
Treaty on the Prohibition of Nuclear Weapons

Notes

References
 Sands, Philippe; and Law, Helen; The United Kingdom's nuclear deterrent:Current and future issies of legality (PDF) for  Greenpeace.
Singh, Rabinder; and Chinkin, Christine; The Maintenance and Possible Replacement of the Trident Nuclear Missile System Introduction and Summary of Advice for Peacerights
 United Kingdom Permanent Representative to the Conference on Disarmament Britain's Nuclear Deterrent
 United Nations General Assembly A/RES/49/75/K: Request for an advisory opinion from the International Court of Justice on the legality of the threat or use of nuclear weapons 90th plenary meeting 15 December 1994.
 Weiss, Peter; Notes on a Misunderstood Decision: The World Court's Near Perfect Advisory Opinion in the Nuclear Weapons Case, website of the Lawyers' Committee on Nuclear Policy (LCNP) July 22, 1996

ICJ documents
ICJ documents relating to the case
Legality of the threat or use of nuclear weapons (General List No. 95) 8 July 1996
Summary of the Advisory Opinion
Declarations of individual judges:
Declaration of President Bedjaoui
Declaration of Judge Herczegh
Declaration of Judge Shi
Declaration of Judge Vereshchetin
Declaration of Judge Ferrari Bravo
Separate Opinions of individual judges:
Separate Opinion of Judge Guillaume
Separate Opinion of Judge Ranjeva
Separate Opinion of Judge Fleischhauer
Dissenting Opinions of individual judges:
Dissenting Opinion of Vice-President Schwebel
Dissenting Opinion of Judge Oda
Dissenting Opinion of Judge Shahabuddeen
Dissenting Opinion of Judge Weeramantry
Dissenting Opinion of Judge Koroma
Dissenting Opinion of Judge Higgins

Further reading
David, Eric; "The Opinion of the International Court of Justice on the Legality of the Use of Nuclear Weapons" (1997) 316 International Review of the Red Cross 21.
Condorelli, Luigi; "Nuclear Weapons: A Weighty Matter for the International Court of Justice" (1997) 316 International Review of the Red Cross 9, 11.
 Ginger, Ann Fagan; "Looking at the United Nations through The Prism of National Peace Law," 36(2) UN Chronicle62 (Summer 1999).
Greenwood, Christopher; "The Advisory Opinion on Nuclear Weapons and the Contribution of the International Court to International Humanitarian Law" (1997) 316 International Review of the Red Cross 65.
Greenwood, Christopher; "Jus ad Bellum and Jus in Bello in the Nuclear Weapons Advisory Opinion" in Laurence Boisson de Chazournes and Phillipe Sands (eds), International Law, the International Court of Justice and Nuclear Weapons (1999) 247, 249.
Holdstock, Dougaylas; and Waterston, Lis; "Nuclear weapons, a continuing threat to health," 355(9214) The Lancet 1544 (29 April 2000).
Jeutner, Valentin; "Irresolvable Norm Conflicts in International Law: The Concept of a Legal Dilemma" (Oxford University Press 2017), .
McNeill, John; "The International Court of Justice Advisory Opinion in the Nuclear Weapons Cases--A First Appraisal" (1997) 316 International Review of the Red Cross 103, 117.
Mohr, Manfred; "Advisory Opinion of the International Court of Justice on the Legality of the Use of Nuclear Weapons Under International Law--A Few Thoughts on its Strengths and Weaknesses" (1997) 316 International Review of the Red Cross 92, 94.
Moore, Mike; "World Court says mostly no to nuclear weapons," 52(5) Bulletin of the Atomic Scientists, 39 (Sept-October 1996).
Moxley, Charles J.; Nuclear Weapons and International Law in the Post Cold War World (Austin & Winfield 2000), .

Nuclear weapons policy
International Court of Justice cases
1996 in case law
1996 in international relations
Aggression in international law